Orlando Henderson Petty (February 20, 1874 – June 2, 1932) was an American physician and naval officer. As a surgeon in the United States Naval Reserve, he received the Medal of Honor for his actions during World War I.

Early life and family
Petty was born in Cadiz, Ohio on February 20, 1874. To Asbury Festus Petty and Sallie M Kyle. Orlando had a twin brother Orville A Petty and a younger sister Netta A Petty. He graduated from Jefferson Medical College in Philadelphia in 1904 and two years later joined the school's teaching staff. In 1908, he married Marcia P. Mellersh of Philadelphia; the couple had two children, Clara M. and Orville A. Petty.

Military service
Petty joined the U.S. Naval Reserve Force as a lieutenant, junior grade, in December 1916 and served in the Medical Corps. After the United States' entry into World War I, he was sent to France where he worked as an assistant surgeon. In March 1918, he was promoted to lieutenant.

By June 11, 1918, Petty was attached to the 5th Marine Regiment as the unit took part in the Battle of Belleau Wood. On that day, his dressing station in Lucy-le-Bocage came under heavy fire from German artillery, some of which were firing poison gas shells. He continued to evacuate and treat the wounded, even after he was knocked to the ground and his gas mask rendered useless by an exploding shell. When the dressing station was destroyed, he personally carried wounded Captain Lloyd W. Williams to safety. Captain Williams was the Marine famously quoted as saying "Retreat? Hell, we just got here!" For these actions, Petty was awarded the Medal of Honor.

Other decorations which Petty received during the war include the Distinguished Service Cross, the Croix de Guerre with palm from France, and the Croce di Guerra from Italy.

Later years and death
After his military service, Petty returned to Philadelphia and resumed teaching medicine. From 1923 until shortly before his death, he was a professor of metabolic diseases at the University of Pennsylvania. He was also the personal physician of Philadelphia mayor Harry A. Mackey. In 1931, Mackey appointed him as the head of the city's public health department.  Petty was a member of the Sons of the Revolution.

On June 2, 1932, Petty's family found him dead in the bedroom of his Philadelphia home. He had been shot through the heart, apparently with his military service pistol, which was found nearby. His family noted that he had been in poor health for some time; his death was ruled a suicide. He is buried at Saint Timothy's Episcopal Church Cemetery in Philadelphia's Roxborough neighborhood.

Obituary
The Philadelphia Inquirer: Date: 6-3-1932, Pg.1 and 10: DR O H PETTY ENDS OWN LIFE EX-HEALTH HEAD - Director During Last Months of Mackey Regime Kills Self With Pistol - Found Dead at Home at 1803 Pine, Was World War Hero, One-time President of Medical Society: Dr Orlando H Petty former Director of the Public Health in the closing period of the Mackey administration, widely known physician and World War hero, hot and killed himself with a German Luger pistol, a war trophy, in a bedroom of his home at 1803 Pine St, shortly before six o'clock last night. He was 57 years of age.  Dr Petty and Dr Joel T Boone, personal physician to President Hoover, were the only physicians to be decorated with the Congressional Metal of Honor for heroic service during the World War. In additional to the Congressional decoration Dr Petty received other metals in recognition of his valor while under fire in a front-line dressing station during heavy fighting in June 1918.  The physician apparently entered his bedroom shortly after 5 P.M. yesterday. At about 5:45 P.M. he pressed the heavy Luger against his breast and pulled the trigger. A bullet ripped through his heart, killing him instantly.  SECRETARY FINDS BODY  The report was heard by Dr Petty's secretary, Miss Rose Cullen, of 608 Wynnewood Rd, Overbrook. She rushed to the bedroom to find the man dead. After notifying members of the family of the tragedy the young woman summoned the police and the coroner.  The body of Dr Petty was removed to Graduate Hospital for official verification of death. The remains were then removed to the morgue.  Detectives who talked to members of the family said that they were given to understand that Dr Petty had been in ill health. Despondency over his condition was the only motive the family could advance as a possible motive for his self-destruction.  In April 1931, Dr Petty was confined to Mt Sinai Hospital suffering from a complaint the nature of which was unrevealed.  Last September Dr Petty was appointed Director of the Department of Public Health to fill the vacancy created by the Dr A A Cairns. He also was person physician to Mayor Mackey and accompanied the latter on his European trip.  GRADUATE OF JEFFERSON Dr Petty was graduated from Franklin College, New Athens, Ohio in 1900, and from Jefferson Medical College in 1904 and served as an intern in St Timothy's Hospital. He was an associate surgeon with Dr John B Lowman, of Johnstown, for one year and then returned here and was connected with the teaching staff of Jefferson Medical College until 1923.  From 1923 until recently, Dr Petty was professor of disease of metabolism in the Graduate School of Medicine of the University of Pennsylvania.  He served under the late Dr Cairns as a medical inspector of the Board of Health of 1908 until after the World War. In 1924 he wrote a book on "Diabetes and Its Treatment by Insulin and Diet." It recently reached its fifth edition. He also was author of many articles on scientific matters.  He was the author of an important work on "Prevention of Communicable Respiratory Disease Based on Observations in Army Camps." He introduced insulin here after its discovery at the University of Toronto.  Dr Petty maintained offices at his home on Pine St. He shared his office with Drs Charles J Haines and John A Murphy.  He was a member of the Philadelphia County Medical Society, The Pennsylvania State Medical Society, a Fellow of the American Medical Association, the American College of Physicians, the College of Physicians of Philadelphia and numerous other medical societies. SERVED WITH MARINES  On April 2, 1917, Dr Petty was assigned as captain to active duty as a surgeon of the United States Marine Corps. He sailed for France in August, 1917 and served with the Fifth Marines, Second Division. For "valor in battle against an armed enemy of the United States" Dr Petty received the following decorations: The Congressional Metal of Honor, the United States Distinguished Service Cross, French Croix de Guerre with palm and the Italian War Cross.  Dr Petty and Joel T Boone, personal physician to President Hoover, are the only physicians serving in the World War who received the Congressional Metal of Honor.  The act of heroism for which Dr Petty was honored occurred on June 11, 1918, while in fierce action with the Marines. Under heavy shell fire he worked in his frontline dressing station until the building literally fell in flames over him. He then managed to escape to a place of safety, carrying a wounded officer on his back.  FORMER MEDICAL SOCIETY HEAD He was severally gassed and was in a hospital for many days. he finally insisted upon being released from the hospital and immediately returned to front-line duty.  He served as physician to the Memorial Hospital, Roxborough, pathologist in that institution and also as pathologist to the Germantown Hospital. He was a past president of the Philadelphia County Medical Society and of the Medical Club of Philadelphia; a past national commander of the Army and Navy Legion of Valor and past commander of the Thomas Roberts Reath Post, No 186, American Legion.  In 1924 he was appointed physician in charge of the Department of Metabolism of the Philadelphia Hospital. In addition to being a member of several leading physicians' organizations he belonged to the Pennsylvania Society, Sons of the Revolution, Aesculapian and Manufacturers Clubs.  He also belonged to the University Club, Ocean City Golf Club and Lu Lu Temple Country Club. He was an Episcopalian by faith and a 32nd Degree Mason.  Dr Petty was born in Cadiz, O. In 1908 he married Miss Marcia P Mellersh of this city. In addition to his wife, he is survived by a daughter, Miss Clara M Petty, and a son Orville A Petty, 2nd.

Medal of Honor citation
Petty's official Medal of Honor citation reads:
For extraordinary heroism while serving with the 5th Regiment, U.S. Marines, in France during the attack in the Bois de Belleau, 11 June 1918. While under heavy fire of high explosive and gas shells in the town of Lucy, where his dressing station was located, Lt. Petty attended to and evacuated the wounded under most trying conditions. Having been knocked to the ground by an exploding gas shell which tore his mask, Lt. Petty discarded the mask and courageously continued his work. His dressing station being hit and demolished, he personally helped carry Capt. Williams, wounded, through the shellfire to a place of safety.

See also

List of Medal of Honor recipients for World War I

References

External links

1874 births
1932 deaths
People from Cadiz, Ohio
Physicians from Philadelphia
United States Navy Medical Corps officers
American military personnel of World War I
United States Navy Medal of Honor recipients
Suicides by firearm in Pennsylvania
American military personnel who committed suicide
Recipients of the Croix de Guerre 1914–1918 (France)
Recipients of the Distinguished Service Cross (United States)
World War I recipients of the Medal of Honor
Suicides in Philadelphia
American public health doctors
1932 suicides
Military personnel from Ohio